Christian Kulik (born 6 December 1952) is a German former professional footballer who played as a midfielder. He spent ten seasons in the Bundesliga with Borussia Mönchengladbach.

Career
Kulik was born in Zabrze, Silesia, Poland. He made 220 Bundesliga appearances for Borussia Mönchengladbach.

He ended his career after a stint with FSV Salmrohr.

Honours
 European Cup finalist: 1976–77
 UEFA Europa League: 1974–75, 1978–79; runner-up 1972–73, 1979–80
 Bundesliga: 1974–75, 1975–76, 1976–77; runner-up: 1973–74, 1977–78
 DFB-Pokal: 1972–73

References

External links
 
 Profile – FC Antwerp

1952 births
Living people
German footballers
Polish emigrants to West Germany
Sportspeople from Zabrze
Association football midfielders
UEFA Cup winning players
Bundesliga players
2. Bundesliga players
Alemannia Aachen players
Borussia Mönchengladbach players
Royal Antwerp F.C. players
FC Chur players
FSV Salmrohr players
West German expatriate footballers
Expatriate footballers in Belgium
West German expatriate sportspeople in Belgium
Expatriate footballers in Switzerland
West German expatriate sportspeople in Switzerland
West German footballers